Clifton is a census-designated place (CDP) and post office in and governed by Mesa County, Colorado, United States. It is part of the Grand Junction, CO Metropolitan Statistical Area. The Clifton post office has the ZIP Code 81520. As of the 2020 census, the population of the Clifton CDP was 20,413.

History
The Clifton Post Office has been in operation since 1900. The community was named for cliffs near the town site.

Geography
Clifton is in central Mesa County, bordered to the west by the city of Grand Junction and to the northwest by unincorporated Fruitvale. The Colorado River forms the southern edge of the community. U.S. Route 6 passes through the center of Clifton, leading west  to the center of Grand Junction and east the same distance to Palisade. Interstate 70 passes along the northern edge of Clifton, with access from Exit 37 (I-70 Business). Colorado State Highway 141 leads south from US 6,  to U.S. Route 50.

Demographics

See also

 List of census-designated places in Colorado

References

External links

 Clifton @ Colorado.com
 Clifton @ UncoverColorado.com
 Mesa County website

Census-designated places in Mesa County, Colorado
Census-designated places in Colorado